This is a list of Japanese sportspeople not otherwise included in more specific Japanese sportspeople lists.

Mao Asada - Figure Skater, Olympic silver medalist, multiple world champion
Ando Miki - Figure skater, multiple world champion
Antonio Inoki
Arakawa Shizuka - Figure skater, Olympic champion, world champion
Yuzuru Hanyu Figure skater, double Olympic champion, double world champion, multiple Grand Prix Final champion, Four Continents champion (Super Slam)
Asai Yoshirō
Chiyonofuji
Chuhei Nambu
Date Kimiko
Funaki Shōichi
Sawamatsu Naoko retired tennis player
Gomi Takanori
Hiro matsushita
Hiroyuki Tomita Beijing olympic gymnast
Iguchi Tadahito
Inamoto Junichi
Itō Midori - Figure skater, Olympic silver medalist, world champion
Kohiruimaki Takayuki
Konishiki
Maruyama Shigeki
Masato
Matsui Hideki
Miura Kazuyoshi
Keiichi Tsuchiya - retired racing driver, D1 Grand Prix judge
Ken Nomura - D1 Grand Prix driver
Kōhei Uchimura gymnast, double Olympic champion and multiple world champion
Mai Murakami - Rio Olympic gymnast, world champion
Koji Murofushi
Musashimaru
Nakata Hidetoshi - football (soccer) player
Nao Kodaira speed skater, Olympic champion
Nobuteru Taniguchi - racing driver
Ōta Yukina Figure skater
Sakuraba Kazushi
Sato Rumina
Satō Takuma (1977-), Formula 1 driver, 2017 Indianapolis 500 winner
Sato Yuka Figure skater, world champion
Avi Schafer (born 1998), professional basketball player 
Kenzō Shirai - Rio Olympic gymnast, multiple world champion
Sudō Genki
Sugayama Kaoru
Sugiyama Ai (1975-), Tennis player
Suguri Fumie - Figure skater
Suzuki Ichirō
Takeda Kōzō (1972-), Kickboxer
Takahashi Daisuke - Figure skater, Olympic bronze medalist, world champion
Uno Shoma - Figure skater, Olympic silver medalist, multiple world medalist
Yasuyuki Kazama - D1 Grand Prix driver 
Saori Kimura